Chukwuemeka Ibezimife Nwadike  (born 9 August 1978) is an English former professional  footballer of Nigerian descent.

He played as a midfielder notably in the Football League for Shrewsbury Town between 1996 and 1998. Following on from that he held a career in Non-League football and played for Grantham Town, King's Lynn, Ilkeston Town, Hednesford Town, Alfreton Town, Worcester City, AFC Telford United, Hinckley United, Eastwood Town, Gainsborough Trinity, Mickleover Sports, Stamford and Rainworth Miners Welfare.

Early life
He attended St. Edwards RC Primary School and Robert Sutton Catholic High School in Burton-upon-Trent.

Career
Nwadike began his career in the youth ranks at Wolverhampton Wanderers but was snubbed a professional contract and was snapped up by Shrewsbury Town in 1996. After two seasons at Gay Meadow he was released and exited the Football League to join Non-League Grantham Town. He moved on to King's Lynn in 2000 and then on to Ilkeston Town in 2001.

Ilkeston loaned Nwadike to Hednesford Town in 2003, and he was eventually released at the end of the 2002–2003 season. In June 2003 he signed for Northern Premier League side Alfreton Town on a free transfer, eventually becoming club captain as well as making 126 league appearances, some of which came in the Conference North division that was formed in 2004 with Alfreton as a founding member. In 2007, he joined Worcester City, and later A.F.C. Telford United a year later. Following 20 appearances for United in the 2008–2009 season he was made available for loan and signed with Hinckley United for the remainder of the season.

In July 2009 Nwadike joined Eastwood Town, and a year later he was amongst a number of new signings made by Brian Little at Gainsborough Trinity. He failed to make a single appearance for the club from joining the club in July 2010 to his departure in March 2011, namely because of an achilles injury. He re-joined Eastwood Town in March and in June 2011 he began an employment tribunal against Gainsborough for a confidential matter between club and player.

Nwadike then joined Northern Premier League team Stamford A.F.C. in February 2014 to add some experience to a young team in their bid to remain in the division having been promoted via the play-offs the season before.

References

External links

Player History Profile 
Grantham Town Profile
Worcester F.C. Profile
Soccerfacts UK Profile

1978 births
Living people
English people of Igbo descent
Igbo sportspeople
Wolverhampton Wanderers F.C. players
Shrewsbury Town F.C. players
Grantham Town F.C. players
King's Lynn F.C. players
Ilkeston Town F.C. (1945) players
Hednesford Town F.C. players
Alfreton Town F.C. players
Worcester City F.C. players
AFC Telford United players
Hinckley United F.C. players
Eastwood Town F.C. players
Gainsborough Trinity F.C. players
Mickleover Sports F.C. players
Stamford A.F.C. players
Rainworth Miners Welfare F.C. players
English people of Nigerian descent
Association football midfielders
English footballers